The minister for women and gender equality and youth a minister of the Crown and member of the Canadian Cabinet. The position is responsible for the Department for Women and Gender Equality and the youth portfolio is associated with the Department of Canadian Heritage.

History 
The position previously existed as Minister of Status of Women, responsible for what was then known as Status of Women Canada. Traditionally, the office that held the Status of Women portfolio under their purview, that minister has been designated the additional honorary title of Minister responsible for the Status of Women. 

The Status of Women portfolio was originally created in 1971 as a product of the Royal Commission on the Status of Women (created in 1967), who completed their report in 1970. The title of Minister for Women and Gender Equality was created in 2018, following the passage of the Budget Implementation Act, 2018, No. 2 and the creation of the Department fort Women and Gender Equality, separating Status of Women Canada from the Department of Canadian Heritage. Responsibility for youth issues was added to the portfolio in 2021, once again associating the office with the Department of Canadian Heritage.

List of ministers

History 
The "status of women" portfolio was originally created in 1971 as result of the Royal Commission on the Status of Women (created in 1967), who completed their report in 1970. This new position, originally titled the Office of the Co-ordinator, Status of Women, was initially meant to help implement the recommendations of the Royal Commission.

During the 1993–2003 ministry of Jean Chrétien, the position was titled Secretary of State (Status of Women), as it did not carry full cabinet rank. The first cabinet of Paul Martin also kept this title, as the office's responsibilities were delegated from the Minister of Canadian Heritage. However, in July 2004, the title reverted to Minister responsible for the Status of Women with the swearing-in of Liza Frulla, who doubled as Heritage Minister and was thus ultimately responsible for Status of Women Canada.

In 2016, the position was made a member of the Queen’s Privy Council for Canada. In 2018, following the passage of the Budget Implementation Act, 2018, No. 2, Status of Women Canada became a federal department called the Women and Gender Equality Canada (WAGE). WAGE administers the Governor General's Awards in Commemoration of the Persons Case. One of the programs started by the Status of Women Canada was an education/analysis program called gender-based Analysis Plus (GBA+).

References

External links
Status of Women Canada presently being renamed to Women and Gender Equality Canada (WAGE)
CBC Digital Archives - Equality First: The Royal Commission on the Status of Women

Status of Women
Department of Canadian Heritage
Canada, Women_and_Gender_Equality Minister
Women's organizations based in Canada
Canada
Women's rights in Canada